Silvia Hollmann-Schieck (born 13 May 1955 in Menden (Sauerland), North Rhine-Westphalia) is a retired West German hurdler.

At the 1978 European Championships she won the silver medal in 400 m hurdles and finished fifth in 4 x 400 m relay. She also competed at the 1976 Summer Olympics.

References

1955 births
Living people
People from Menden (Sauerland)
Sportspeople from Arnsberg (region)
West German female hurdlers
Athletes (track and field) at the 1976 Summer Olympics
Olympic athletes of West Germany
European Athletics Championships medalists